James Archer RSA (10 June 1823 – 3 September 1904), was a Scottish painter of portraits, genre works, landscapes and historical scenes.

Life 
James Archer was born in Edinburgh, the first of four children to Andrew Archer, a dentist, and his wife, Ann Cunningham Gregory. His sister was Georgina Archer who founded an early college for women in Germany. The family lived at 25 Hanover Street in the First New Town, close to Princes Street.

He was educated at the Royal High School and studied at the Trustee's Academy in Edinburgh under Sir William Allan and Thomas Duncan (painter). In 1840, he was accepted as a student at the Royal Scottish Academy and first exhibited there in 1842, with the biblical painting, "The Child St John in the Wilderness". He became an associate of the academy in 1850, and in 1858 an Academician (RSA).

In 1844, he was listed as living at 21 York Place in Edinburgh's New Town. In 1848, he joined the Edinburgh Smashers Club: a sketching club (which probably also involved alcohol).

Archer worked in oils, pencil and chalk, and at the beginning of his career specialised in portraiture, his best-known work includes children and people in costume as its subjects - in fact, he was the first Victorian painter to do children's portraits in period costume.  In 1849 he exhibited his first historical picture 'The Last Supper' at the Royal Scottish Academy. His work after that mostly consisted of scenes taken from literature or legends that were popular at the time, such as Shakespeare and King Arthur. In about 1859 he began to paint a series of Arthurian subjects, including several versions of La Mort d'Arthur, which depict a melancholy king being led to his death by Merlin, and Sir Lancelot and Queen Guinevere.

In 1864, he moved to London, living at 21 Phillimore Gardens, moving in 1882 to 7 Cromwell Place. In the 1880s, Archer travelled to the United States, where he painted Andrew Carnegie's portrait, and to India, where he painted landscapes and people in costume.

Archer died on 3 September 1904 in Haslemere in Surrey. He was buried in the churchyard at Haslemere.

Family

In 1853 he married Jane Clerk Lawson, daughter of the Edinburgh lawyer James Lawson WS of 4 Malta Terrace in the Stockbridge district. At the time of his death he had one son and three daughters.

Works

Archer mainly worked on historical and religious scenes of a figurative nature. He received multiple commissions for portraits. Notable subjects include Andrew Carnegie, James G. Blaine, Lady Dufferin, Lord Dalhousie, Sir George Trevelyan, 2nd Baronet, John Stuart Blackie, Sir Henry Irving, Edwin Arnold, and Daniel Macnee.

References

External links

James Archer online (ArtCyclopedia)
Paintings by Archer (Art Renewal Center)
Summertime Gloucestershire (childhoodinart.org)

19th-century Scottish painters
Scottish male painters
20th-century Scottish painters
Scottish portrait painters
Scottish landscape painters
1822 births
1904 deaths
People educated at the Royal High School, Edinburgh
Alumni of the Edinburgh College of Art
Royal Scottish Academicians
19th-century Scottish male artists
20th-century Scottish male artists